Nizhny Shaksher is a rural locality (a selo) in Cherdynsky District, Perm Krai, Russia. The population was 47 as of 2010. There are 2 streets.

Geography 
Nizhny Shaksher is located 100 km southwest of Cherdyn (the district's administrative centre) by road. Bayandina is the nearest rural locality.

References 

Rural localities in Cherdynsky District